Pudong Avenue is the name of a station on Line 4 and Line 14 of the Shanghai Metro. It is the first station on Line 4 in Pudong travelling clockwise after crossing the Huangpu River from Puxi. Service began at this station on 31 December 2005. It later became an interchange station on 30 December 2021 after the opening of Line 14.

Station Layout

Gallery

References

Shanghai Metro stations in Pudong
Line 4, Shanghai Metro
Railway stations in China opened in 2005
Railway stations in Shanghai
Line 14, Shanghai Metro